The 1950–51 season saw Tottenham Hotspur follow their success of the previous season winning the Second Division to go on and win the First Division for the first time in their history. Spurs entered the FA Cup in the third round and were drawn away to Huddersfield Town, they lost 2–0.

Squad

 (C)

Competitions

First Division

Fixtures
Source:

Tottenham were crowned champions after their penultimate game against Sheffield Wednesday which they won 1–0.

FA Cup

Source data:

Notes
 Game attendance data from: Tottenham Hotspur Official Handbook 2018–2019

References

Tottenham Hotspur F.C. seasons
Tottenham Hotspur
English football championship-winning seasons